Kimiya (written: 公哉 or 亀美也) is a Japanese given name. Notable people with the name include:

 (born 1989), Japanese racing driver
 (born 1970), Japanese astronaut

Japanese given names
Japanese masculine given names